Frank Parker Day (9 May 1881 – 30 July 1950) was a Canadian athlete, academic and author.

Since Day's father was a Methodist minister who moved to a new congregation every three years, Day spent his youth living throughout Nova Scotia, living in Wallace, Acadia Mines, Mahone Bay, Boylston, and Lockeport.

Early life and education
When he was seventeen, Day attended Lunenburg Academy and from there went on to earn a BA, in 1903 from Mount Allison University. Day was a member of the varsity rugby football team while completing his undergraduate studies. On the school's new athletic field Day scored Mount Allison's first points in the intercollegiate Rugby football in 1900.

He later won a Rhodes Scholarship, studying at Oxford University in 1905. Day was an athlete, and won the Oxford-Cambridge Heavyweight Championship. Returning to Canada, he embarked on an academic career, teaching English at the University of New Brunswick, before being appointed president of Union College in Schenectady, New York.

War service
Having served with the King Edward's Light Horse while at Oxford University, followed by a year with the 28th New Brunswick Dragoons before filling the position of junior major with the 85th Overseas Battalion. Day served in the Canadian Army. where he played a crucial role in recruiting and training of the 185th Canadian Infantry Battalion (Cape Breton Highlanders), CEF.

Details of the 94th Victoria Regiment "Argyll Highlanders" were called out on active service on 6 August 1914 for local protection duties.

The 85th Battalion (Nova Scotia Highlanders), CEF was authorized on 10 July 1915 and embarked for Great Britain on 12 October 1916. It disembarked in France on 10 February 1917, where it fought as part of the 12th Infantry Brigade, 4th Canadian Division in France and Flanders until the end of the war. The battalion was subsequently disbanded on 15 September 1920.

The 185th Canadian Infantry Battalion (Cape Breton Highlanders), CEF was authorized on 15 July 1916 with Day as its lieutenant colonel, and embarked for Great Britain on 12 October 1916. There it provided reinforcements for the Canadian Corps in the field until 15 February 1918, when its personnel were absorbed by the 17th Reserve Battalion, CEF. Day then commanded the 25th Battalion from August to October 1918.

Literary career
He practiced writing poetry, songs, essays, and news items during his student and army days. After the war he wrote stories for the Atlantic Monthly and Harper's Magazine

 Roses of Mercatel, Carnegie Institute of Technology, Pittsburgh, School of Music and Drama, 1920
 The Hour before Dawn, Carnegie Institute of Technology, Pittsburgh, School of Music and Drama, 1921
 An Epic of Marble Mountain, Harper's Magazine, New York, 1923
 "The Iroquois", Atlantic Monthly 1923

Writings
River of Strangers Doubleday, Page & Co., New York 1926
The Autobiography of a Fisherman Doubleday, Page & Co., New York 1927
Rockbound Minton, Balch & Co., New York 1928
John Paul's Rock Minton, Balch & Co., New York 1932
 A Good Citizen Mount Allison University, Sackville, NB (Josiah Wood Lectures) 134pp

Awards
His novel Rockbound was chosen for inclusion in Canada Reads 2005, championed by Donna Morrissey. Rockbound eventually won the competition.

Later life
When the Days came back to Nova Scotia to live they still had a struggle to make a living as Frank's medical expenses had been considerable, including the cost of convalescing in the Southern States and the West Indies. Frank was unsuccessful in getting war disability allowance. His arthritis had stemmed from a blow on the back during a battle in World War I. Retiring to the family cottage the Days spend their time at the tiny village of Lake Annis in Yarmouth County. Where Frank spent his time with friends Harry Hamilton and Joe (Jim) Charles, the Mi'kmaq guide in Hectanooga. They spend their season fishing, hunting, paddling  the water ways of Yarmouth County.

References

External links
Frank Parker Day bio at Union College website

1881 births
1950 deaths
Canadian male novelists
Canadian Methodists
Mount Allison University alumni
Angling writers
Writers from Nova Scotia
20th-century Canadian novelists
20th-century Canadian male writers
Presidents of Union College (New York)
Canadian Expeditionary Force officers
Canadian military personnel from Nova Scotia